Grant Doyle may refer to:

Grant Doyle (baritone), Australian/British operatic baritone
Grant Doyle (tennis) (born 1974), Australian former tennis player and coach